Zion Elementary School District 6 is an Illinois school district serving Zion, Lake County. The school district governs seven schools. Lakeview School is responsible for prekindergarten children, housing also the district's administrative offices. Beulah Park Elementary School, East Elementary School, Elmwood Elementary School, Shiloh Park Elementary School and West Elementary School serve students between kindergarten and sixth grade. Zion Elementary School District 6's sole middle school, Zion Central Middle School, serves the seventh and eighth grades.

References

External links
home page

School districts in Lake County, Illinois
Zion, Illinois